Manchester is a city in Coffee County, Tennessee, United States. The population was 12,213 at the 2020 census. It is the county seat of Coffee County. The city is located halfway between Nashville and Chattanooga on Interstate 24.

Manchester is part of the Tullahoma, Tennessee Micropolitan Statistical Area.

Since 2002, Manchester has been the host city for the annual Bonnaroo Music Festival. The city's population swells to nearly 100,000 people for the four-day event, for which people travel across the country to camp and enjoy continuous and diverse music.

History
A post office called Manchester has been in operation since 1817. The city was named after Manchester, in England. According to historians, "A small village, “Mitchellsville” was already in existence near the proposed site for the new county seat, but when the new county was formed, it was renamed “Manchester” after the industrial city of Manchester, England. Because of the abundance of water power, provided by the “Little Duck” & “Big Duck” Rivers, which flow through Manchester, it was hoped that it also would become a great industrial city."

Long-time Mayor Lonnie J. Norman died of COVID-19 in 2020, during the COVID-19 pandemic.

Geography
Manchester is located slightly south of the center of Coffee County at  (35.473337, -86.085512). Interstate 24 passes through the northeast side of the city, with access from Exits 110, 111, and 114. Exit "112" is available directly from the shoulder of I-24 which meets the western edge of the Bonnaroo Music Festival site. Tennessee State Route 55 passes through the east side of Manchester as McArthur Street; it leads northeast  to McMinnville and southwest  to Tullahoma.

The Little Duck River passes through the city, joining the Duck River just west of the city limits. The Duck River, a tributary of the Tennessee River, passes through the northwest corner of the city. Both rivers drop over waterfalls above their confluence, within Old Stone Fort State Archaeological Park.

Demographics

2020 census

As of the 2020 United States census, there were 12,213 people, 4,141 households, and 2,582 families residing in the city.

2000 census
As of the census of 2000, there were 8,294 people, 3,326 households, and 2,148 families residing in the city. The population density was 752.0 people per square mile (290.3/km2). There were 3,633 housing units at an average density of 329.4 per square mile (127.2/km2). The racial makeup of the city was 92.66% White, 3.91% African American, 0.37% Native American, 1.21% Asian, 1.00% from other races, and 0.86% from two or more races. Hispanic or Latino of any race were 3.28% of the population.

There were 3,326 households, out of which 27.8% had children under the age of 18 living with them, 48.7% were married couples living together, 11.9% had a female householder with no husband present, and 35.4% were non-families. 31.0% of all households were made up of individuals, and 14.4% had someone living alone who was 65 years of age or older. The average household size was 2.35 and the average family size was 2.91.

The age of the population was spread out, with 22.5% under the age of 18, 8.3% from 18 to 24, 27.7% from 25 to 44, 22.1% from 45 to 64, and 19.4% who were 65 years of age or older. The median age was 39 years. For every 100 females, there were 88.3 males. For every 100 females age 18 and over, there were 86.0 males.

The median income for a household in the city was $31,983, and the median income for a family was $38,404. Males had a median income of $31,708 versus $21,380 for females. The per capita income for the city was $17,168. About 13.1% of families and 17.6% of the population were below the poverty line, including 22.0% of those under age 18 and 20.0% of those age 65 or over.

Notable people
 DJ Qualls, film actor, Road Trip, The New Guy, Hustle & Flow.
 Betty Sain, horse trainer and breeder
J. Stanley Rogers, Tennessee House of Representatives majority leader

Points of interest

 Old Stone Fort, part of Old Stone Fort State Archaeological Park, adjacent to the western city limits
 Great Stage Park is a 650-acre (2.6 km2) outdoor event space. Since 2002 it has been home to the Bonnaroo Music and Arts Festival, the largest outdoor festival in North America. 
Manchester - Coffee County Conference Center, a full service event facility including catering and both indoor/outdoor event spaces.

References

External links

 City of Manchester official website
 The Manchester Times (newspaper)
 City charter

 
Cities in Coffee County, Tennessee
Cities in Tennessee
County seats in Tennessee
Tullahoma, Tennessee micropolitan area